Panguilemo Airport is an airport  northeast of Talca, capital of the Maule Region of Chile.

See also

Transport in Chile
List of airports in Chile

References

External links
Panguilemo Airport at OpenStreetMap
Panguilemo Airport at OurAirports

Airports in Chile
Airports in Maule Region